David Benatar (born 8 December 1966) is a South African philosopher, academic, and author. He is best known for his advocacy of antinatalism in his book Better Never to Have Been: The Harm of Coming into Existence, in which he argues that coming into existence is serious harm, regardless of the feelings of the existing being once brought into existence, and that, as a consequence, it is always morally wrong to create more sentient beings.

Early life and education 
Benatar is the son of Solomon Benatar, a global-health expert who founded the Bioethics Centre at the University of Cape Town. Not much is known about Benatar's personal life as he deliberately guards his privacy. He has held antinatalist views since his childhood.

Academic career 
Benatar is a professor of philosophy and director of the Bioethics Centre at the University of Cape Town in Cape Town, South Africa. He is a member of the editorial board of the Journal of Controversial Ideas.

Philosophical work

Asymmetry between pain and pleasure 
Benatar argues there is a crucial asymmetry between the good and the bad things, such as pleasure and pain, which means it would be better for humans not to have been born:
 The presence of pain is bad.
 The presence of pleasure is good.
 The absence of pain is good, even if that good is not enjoyed by anyone.
 The absence of pleasure is not bad unless there is somebody for whom this absence is a deprivation.

Implications for procreation 
Benatar argues that bringing someone into existence generates both good and bad experiences, pain and pleasure, whereas not doing so generates neither pain nor pleasure. The absence of pain is good, the absence of pleasure is not bad. Therefore, the ethical choice is weighed in favor of non-procreation.

Benatar raises four other related asymmetries that he considers quite plausible:
 We have a moral obligation not to create unhappy people and we have no moral obligation to create happy people. The reason why we think there is a moral obligation not to create unhappy people is that the presence of this suffering would be bad (for the sufferers) and the absence of the suffering is good (even though there is nobody to enjoy the absence of suffering). By contrast, the reason we think there is no moral obligation to create happy people is that although their pleasure would be good for them, the absence of pleasure when they do not come into existence will not be bad, because there will be no one who will be deprived of this good.
 It is strange to mention the interests of a potential child as a reason why we decide to create them, and it is not strange to mention the interests of a potential child as a reason why we decide not to create them. That the child may be happy is not a morally important reason to create them. By contrast, that the child may be unhappy is an important moral reason not to create them. If it were the case that the absence of pleasure is bad even if someone does not exist to experience its absence, then we would have a significant moral reason to create a child and to create as many children as possible. And if it were not the case that the absence of pain is good even if someone does not exist to experience this good, then we would not have a significant moral reason not to create a child.
 Someday we can regret the sake of a person whose existence was conditional on our decision, that we created them – a person can be unhappy and the presence of their pain would be a bad thing. But we will never feel regret for the sake of a person whose existence was conditional on our decision, that we did not create them – a person will not be deprived of happiness, because he or she will never exist, and the absence of happiness will not be bad, because there will be no one who will be deprived of this good.
We feel sadness by the fact that somewhere people come into existence and suffer, and we feel no sadness by the fact that somewhere people did not come into existence in a place where there are happy people. When we know that somewhere people came into existence and suffer, we feel compassion. The fact that on some deserted island or planet, people did not come into existence and suffer is good. This is because the absence of pain is good even when there is not someone who is experiencing this good. On the other hand, we do not feel sadness by the fact that on some deserted island or planet, people did not come into existence and are not happy. This is because the absence of pleasure is bad only when someone exists to be deprived of this good.

Humans' unreliable assessment of life's quality 
Benatar raises the issue of whether humans inaccurately estimate the true quality of their lives, and has cited three psychological phenomena which he believes are responsible for this: 
 Tendency towards optimism: we have a positively distorted perspective of our lives in the past, present, and future.
 Adaptation: we adapt to our circumstances, and if they worsen, our sense of well-being is lowered in anticipation of those harmful circumstances, according to our expectations, which are usually divorced from the reality of our circumstances. 
 Comparison: we judge our lives by comparing them to those of others, ignoring the negatives which affect everyone to focus on specific differences. And due to our optimism bias, we mostly compare ourselves to those worse off, to overestimate the value of our own well-being.

He concludes:

Sexual discrimination against men and boys 
Benatar's The Second Sexism: Discrimination Against Men and Boys (2012) examines various issues regarding misandry and the negative socially-imposed aspects of male identity. It does not seek to attack or diminish the ideas of feminism, but rather to shine a light on the parallel existence of systemic and cultural discrimination against men and boys, and how it simultaneously contributes to the oppression of women. In a review of the book, philosopher Simon Blackburn writes that "Benatar knows that such examples are likely to meet snorts of disbelief or derision, but he is careful to back up his claims with empirical data," and through this book, he shows that "if it is all too often tough being a woman, it is also sometimes tough being a man, and that any failure to recognise this risks distorting what should be everyone's goal, namely universal sympathy as well as social justice for all, regardless of gender." In another review, the philosopher Iddo Landau praises the work as "a very well-argued book that presents an unorthodox thesis and defends it ably," agreeing with Benatar that "in order to cope with the hitherto ignored second sexism, we should not only acknowledge it, but also dedicate much more empirical and philosophical research to this under-explored topic and, of course, try to change many attitudes, social norms, and laws".

Publications 
Benatar is the author of a series of widely cited papers in medical ethics, including "Between Prophylaxis and Child Abuse" (The American Journal of Bioethics) and "A Pain in the Fetus: Toward Ending Confusion about Fetal Pain" (Bioethics). His work has been published in such journals as Ethics, Journal of Applied Philosophy, Social Theory and Practice, American Philosophical Quarterly, QJM: An International Journal of Medicine, Journal of Law and Religion and the British Medical Journal.

Cultural influence 
Nic Pizzolatto, creator and writer of True Detective, has cited Benatar's Better Never to Have Been as an influence on the TV series (along with Ray Brassier's Nihil Unbound, Thomas Ligotti's The Conspiracy Against the Human Race, Jim Crawford's Confessions of an Antinatalist, and Eugene Thacker's In the Dust of This Planet).

Personal life
Benatar is vegan, and has taken part in debates on veganism. He has argued that humans are "responsible for the suffering and deaths of billions of other humans and non-human animals. If that level of destruction were caused by another species we would rapidly recommend that new members of that species not be brought into existence." He has also argued that the outbreak of zoonotic diseases, such as the COVID-19 pandemic, is often the result of how humans mistreat animals.

Benatar is an atheist and has stated that he has no children of his own.

Bibliography

As editor 

Ethics for Everyday. New York: McGraw-Hill, 2002.
Life, Death & Meaning: Key Philosophical Readings on the Big Questions (2004)

Notes

References

External links 
 University of Cape Town – Benatar's faculty page

 
 

1966 births
Living people
20th-century South African philosophers
21st-century South African philosophers
Anti-natalists
Animal ethicists
Bioethicists
Philosophers of pessimism
South African atheists
South African ethicists
South African non-fiction writers
Academic staff of the University of Cape Town
University of Cape Town alumni